was the 1st daimyō of Shinjō Domain in  Dewa Province, Japan (part of modern-day Yamagata Prefecture). His courtesy title was  Ukyō-no-kami, and his Court rank was Junior Fifth Rank, Lower Grade.

Biography
Tozawa Masamori was the eldest son of Tozawa Moriyasu, but as his mother was a peasant girl whom Moriyasu had raped while engaged in a falconry hunt, he was not expected to inherit. Masamori's mother was subsequent married off to a yamabushi and Masamori was raised as a peasant. However, Moriyasu's death in 1590, followed by that of his uncle Tozawa Mitsumori in 1592, left the clan leaderless and to avoid the possibility of attainder, the clan's retainers tracked  Masamori down, murdered his stepfather, and brought him before Toyotomi Hideyoshi as heir, with Mitsumori's widow as his adopted mother. He fought in the Battle of Sekigahara for the eastern side, and was subsequently awarded a 40,000 koku domain of Matsuoka Domain  in Hitachi Province and this he became daimyō under the Tokugawa shogunate.

During the winter campaign at the Siege of Osaka he was assigned as castellan of Odawara Castle and during the summer campaign he was castellan of Edo Castle. For these services, Shōgun Tokugawa Ieyasu arranged a marriage between Tozawa Masamori and a daughter of Torii Mototada. Following the attainder of the Mogami clan, he accompanied Torii Tadamasa to Dewa Province and was subsequently assigned a portion of the former Mogami lands, which became Shinjō Domain (60,000 koku). The Tozawa clan remained at Shinjō until the Meiji restoration.

Heraldry
 banner: twelve black and white stripes
 great standard: three white umbrellas
 messenger's sashimono: a black horo with two flags
 ashigaru: red disc on blue
 lesser standard: gold horns above a red disc on blue
 sashimono: as for the ashigaru but with a plume

References 
 The content of much of this article was derived from that of the corresponding article on Japanese Wikipedia.

Tozama daimyo
Tozawa clan
1585 births
1648 deaths
People of Sengoku-period Japan